The 1962–63 season was Fussball Club Basel 1893's 69th season in their existence. It was their 17th consecutive season in the top flight of Swiss football after their promotion in the 1945–46 season. They played their home games either in their old Landhof Stadium or in their new St. Jakob Stadium. Lucien Schmidlin was voted as new club chairman at the AGM to follow Ernst Weber, who had announced his retirement from the position.

Overview

Pre-season
The Czechoslovakian manager Jiří Sobotka was the club manager at this time, he taken the job over from Jenő Vincze a year before. A season earlier many youngsters had joined the team and this pre-season the same occurred again. Rolf Lüdi, Enrico Mazzola and Hansruedi Herr were brought up from reserve team. Abraham Levy and Arnold Hofer joined from local team FC Breitenbach, also Werner Meier joined from local team Nordstern Basel. During the winter break Bruno Gatti joined from Black Stars Basel. One of the biggest transfers made during this time was the transfer of the 19 year old Karl Odermatt from Concordia Basel. Odermatt joined in a swop, Hansueli Oberer and Silvan Thüler went to Concordia. Not only these two players left the squad, Paul Speidel moved on to Cantonal Neuchatel and Josef Hügi (Hugi II) was nearly at the end of his football career. "Seppe" Hugi had played 363 competition games for the club and in these had scored 272 goals, he moved on to play for Zürich.

Basel played a total of 51 games this season. Of these 51, 26 were in the domestic league, six were in the Swiss Cup, three in the Cup of the Alps, six in the International Football Cup (IFC) and ten were friendly matches. Of these friendly games, five were won, three drawn and two ended in a defeat, Basel scored 29 goals and conceded 19.

International Football Cup
Basel were appointed as one of four Swiss representatives in the International Football Cup (IFC). The 1962–63 IFC took place during the summer break. Basel played in Group B3 together with PSV Eindhoven, HNK Rijeka and Rot-Weiss Oberhausen. Basel ended the group stage in third position, winners of the group were HNK Rijeka who thus advanced to the quarter-finals.

Domestic league
There were fourteen teams contesting in the 1962–63 Nationalliga A. These were the top 12 teams from the previous season 1961–62 and the two newly promoted teams Chiasso and Sion. The Championship was played in a double round-robin, the champions were to be qualified for 1963–64 European Cup and the bottom placed two teams in the table were to be relegated. Basel finished the championship in sixth position with twenty six points, with ten wins and six draws from 26 matches, scoring 59 goals conceding 51. FC Zürich won the championship. Heinz Blumer was Basel's top scorer this season with 16 goals, Karl Odermatt their second best goal scorer with 14.

Swiss Cup
In the Swiss Cup Basel started in the 3rd principal round, on 3 November, with a 4–0 home win, in the St. Jakob Stadium against Black Stars. In the 4th round, on 2 December, they played away against Young Boys winning 2–0. In the next round, on 30 December they won 7–1 at home against SC Burgdorf. In the quarter-finals, played on 24 February 1963, Basel were drawn away against Chiasso and Basel achieved a 2–1 victory. The semi-final was played on 24 March in the St. Jakob Stadium. Basel beat Lausanne-Sports 1–0 the winning goal scored by Markus Pfirter. The Wankdorf Stadium hosted the Swiss Cup Final on 15 April and Basel played against favorites Grasshopper Club Zürich. Two goals after half time, one by Heinz Blumer and the second from Otto Ludwig gave Basel a 2–0 victory and their third Cup win in their history.

A unique story for the history books over this Cup season belongs Bruno Gatti. In the third round he was member of the Black Stars team and was knocked out of the competition. During the winter break he was hired by Basel. In the final Gatti played the full 90 minutes and became cup winner. Another note belongs to Peter Füri who played in all the cup games except the Final because he became ill.

Cup of the Alps
In the Cup of the Alps Basel were drawn into Group 2, together with Juventus, Grasshopper Club and AS Roma. These matches were all played in Basel and in Zürich. Basel played all their matches at home in the St. Jakob Stadium. In their first match, on 16 June 1963, against Juventus, they were defeated 1–5. Their second game was on 19 June against Grasshopper Club and this ended in a draw. The third match was against AS Roma, but they were defeated 1–4. Juventus qualified for final with three victories and AS Roma qualified for third place match with two victories and one defeat.

Players 

 
 
 
 
 
 
 
 
 

 

 
 

 

 

Players who left the squad

Results 

Legend

Friendly matches

Preseason

Mid-season

Nationalliga A

League matches

League table

Swiss Cup

Inter-Cities Fairs Cup

First Round

Second leg not played and noted without goals as no result. Bayern Munich qualify for second round.

Intertoto Cup (IFC)

Group stage (Group B3)

Group B3 table

Cup of the Alps

Group stage (Group 2)

Group 2 table

See also
 History of FC Basel
 List of FC Basel players
 List of FC Basel seasons

References

Sources 
 Rotblau: Jahrbuch Saison 2014/2015. Publisher: FC Basel Marketing AG. 
 Die ersten 125 Jahre. Publisher: Josef Zindel im Friedrich Reinhardt Verlag, Basel. 
 The FCB team 1962–63 at fcb-archiv.ch
 Switzerland 1962–63 by Erik Garin at Rec.Sport.Soccer Statistics Foundation

External links
 FC Basel official site

FC Basel seasons
Basel